Nebojša Savić (born 4 January 1980) is a Serbian football defender.

References

External links
 

1980 births
Living people
Sportspeople from Loznica
Association football defenders
Serbian footballers
FK Loznica players
FK Smederevo players
FK Čukarički players
FK Zemun players
FK BASK players
FK Radnički Obrenovac players
FK Timok players
Serbian SuperLiga players
Serbian First League players